Kosmos 53 ( meaning Cosmos 53), also known as DS-A1 No.5 was a technology demonstration satellite which was launched by the Soviet Union in 1965 as part of the Dnepropetrovsk Sputnik programme. Its primary mission was to demonstrate technologies for future Soviet military satellites. It also conducted radiation experiments.

It was launched aboard a Kosmos-2I 63S1 rocket, from Site 86/1 at Kapustin Yar. The launch occurred at 09:36 GMT on 30 January 1965.

It decayed on 12 August 1966. Kosmos 53 was the fifth of seven DS-A1 satellites to be launched, and the third to reach orbit after Kosmos 11 and Kosmos 17. The next DS-A1 launch after Kosmos 53 failed (7 February 1965), before the last launch of the DS-A1 programme resulted in Kosmos 70 successfully reaching orbit on 2 July 1965. As with earlier DS-A1 satellites, the technological experiments aboard Kosmos 53 were tests of communications and navigation systems which were later used on the GLONASS system.

See also

 1965 in spaceflight

References

Spacecraft launched in 1965
Kosmos 0053
1965 in the Soviet Union
Dnepropetrovsk Sputnik program